Bal mithai  (Kumaoni: बाल मिठाई, Bāl Mithai) is a brown chocolate-like fudge, made with roasted khoya and coated with white balls made of sugar coated roasted poppy seeds. It is a popular sweet from Kumaon, India.

History
Bal mithai originated in Kumaon. It was an invention of locals of Lal Bazaar, Almora, in the early twentieth century. Scholars believe that bal mithai initially must have been the name of the prime offering to the Sun God.

Recipe
Bal Mithai is made by cooking khoya (evaporated milk cream) with cane sugar until it becomes dark brown in color, colloquially called 'chocolate' for its color resemblance. This is allowed to settle and cool, and cut into cubes which are then coated with small white balls made of sugar coated roasted poppy seeds.

Popularity
Bal mithai has long been a specialty of the Almora district and neighbouring districts of Kumaon, along with singhauri, another preparation of flavoured khoya that comes wrapped in oak leaves.

Geographical Indications Protection
There has been a recent move to make local sweet makers aware of intellectual property rights, and Geographical Indications Protection (GI Protection) under the Geographical Indications of Goods Act of 1999, which would allow them to gain protection for local specialties such as bal mithai and singhauri, which are symbolic to Kumaon.

References

External links
 Bal Mithai at Shabd ::Kumaon: Kala Shilp Aur Sanskriti :: www.himvan.com

Indian desserts
Culture of Uttarakhand
Almora